John Sharp may refer to:

Politicians
John Sharp (New Zealand politician) (1828–1919), Member of Parliament and Mayor of Nelson
John Sharp (Australian politician) (born 1954), Australian politician, member of the Australian House of Representatives
John Sharp (Texas politician) (born 1950), current Chancellor of the Texas A&M University System
John H. Sharp (1874–1957), Justice of the Supreme Court of Texas

Religion
John Sharp (minister) (1572–1647), exiled Scottish minister and Professor of Divinity
John Sharp (bishop) (1643–1714), English divine, Archbishop of York
John Sharp (Mormon) (1820–1891), leader of The Church of Jesus Christ of Latter-day Saints in Utah Territory
John Sharp (priest) (1888–1950), Archdeacon in South-Eastern Europe

Others
John Sharp (actor) (1920–1992), British television actor
John Sharp (British Army officer) (1917–1977), British Army general
John Sharp (footballer) (1885–1965), Scottish footballer
John M. Sharp, professor of geology at The University of Texas at Austin
Jack Sharp (1878–1938), English cricketer (Lancashire) and footballer (Everton)
John Sharp (referee), UFC and MMA official from Australia
John Sharp (rower) (1931–1981), Canadian Olympic rower
John Sharp (1965–1981), victim of the Keddie murders

See also
Jack Sharp (disambiguation)
John Sharpe (disambiguation)
Jon Sharp (born 1977), first team coach of rugby league club Crusaders